Lisanne Rosalie Desiree de Lange (born 31 March 1994) is a field hockey and indoor hockey player from the Netherlands, who plays as a forward.

Personal life
Lisanne de Lange studied law at the Utrecht University.

Career

Club hockey
In the Dutch Hoofdklasse, de Lange played club hockey until 2020 for Laren. With Laren she won the Hoofdklasse Indoor Hockey in both 2018 and 2020. From the 2020 season she played 2 more years for Pinoké, after which she stopped playing at the highest level. In the 2022-2023 season, de Lange was still active indoor, where she became again Hoofdklasse Indoor Hockey champion of the Netherlands together with Pinoké.

National teams

Under–21
Lisanne de Lange made her debut for the Netherlands U–21 in 2013 at the FIH Junior World Cup in Mönchengladbach. She also represented the team at the 2014 EuroHockey Junior Championship in Waterloo. She won gold medals at both events.

Indoor
In 2016 and 2020, de Lange was a member of the Netherlands Indoor team at the Women's EuroHockey Indoor Championship. Both events were hosted in Minsk, with the team winning gold and silver, respectively.

Oranje Dames
In 2013, de Lange was a member of the Netherlands senior national team at the 2012–13 FIH World League Final in San Miguel de Tucumán. De Lange won a gold medal at the event; her only major tournament with the senior team.

References

External links
 
 

1994 births
Living people
Female field hockey forwards
Sportspeople from Utrecht (city)
Dutch female field hockey players
Youth Olympic gold medalists for the Netherlands
20th-century Dutch women
21st-century Dutch women